Renegade Legion: Interceptor is a game based on the Renegade Legion franchise, published in 1990 for Amiga and DOS.

Gameplay
Renegade Legion: Interceptor was a straight translation of the turned-based board game of the same name, and allowed two players to fight each other with a squadron of starfighters. The Interceptor computer game also contained a ship creation generator, providing players the ability to produce custom ships.

Reception
Dave Arneson reviewed the game for Computer Gaming World, and stated that "Overall, Interceptor is quite a good game, very challenging and never the same game twice. This reviewer found no "sure-fire" strategies and no "perfect" design for ships. It is easy to imagine large numbers of people beating the keys well into the night, however, to prove that they have the "perfect" interceptor and the tactics that will always win."

In a 1992 survey of science fiction games, Computer Gaming World gave Renegade Legion Interceptor three of five stars, calling it "an enjoyable interlude". A 1994 survey of strategic space games set in the year 2000 and later gave the game two-plus stars out of five.

Reviews
Amiga Action - Aug, 1991
Games-X - Apr 26, 1991
ASM (Aktueller Software Markt) - Jan, 1991
Computer Gaming World - Nov, 1992
Amiga Power - Aug, 1991
White Wolf #25 (Feb./March, 1991)

References

External links
Review in Info

1990 video games
Amiga games
Computer wargames
DOS games
Strategic Simulations games
Turn-based strategy video games
Video games based on board games
Video games developed in the United States
Video games set in outer space